Talk to the Animals is an Australian television series. It originally was broadcast on the Seven Network between 1993 and 1996, where it was hosted by Harry Cooper. In 2006, the show was relaunched on the Nine Network with Nicky Buckley hosting. In 2010, Dr. Katrina Warren took over the hosting duties. The program also screened internationally on Animal Planet.

The series focuses on the extraordinary relationships between people and animals. It ranges from adventures in the wild to domestic pet advice.

External links
 Official site 
 

Seven Network original programming
Nine Network original programming
1993 Australian television series debuts
1996 Australian television series endings
2006 Australian television series debuts
2010 Australian television series endings
English-language television shows
Animal Planet original programming